Nauai Island (or Nauway Island) is an island located several hundreds of meters southeast of Inampulugan Island. It is located in Sibunag, Guimaras in the Philippines.

References

See also

 List of islands of the Philippines

Islands of Guimaras